The Savior (المخلص) is a 2014 Arabic language Bulgarian-Jordanian film about the life of Jesus directed by Robert Savo written by Philip Dorr.

Cast
Yussuf Abu-Warda, as Luke the Evangelist
Ayman Nahas, as John the Baptist
Shredy Jabarin, as Jesus
Hanan Hillo, as Mary, mother of Jesus
Nariman al Qurneh, as Mary Magdalene  
Mohammad Bakri, as Herod
Maisa Abd Elhadi, as Salome

References

2014 films
Gospel of Luke
Films about Jesus
Portrayals of Jesus in film
Portrayals of the Virgin Mary in film
Film portrayals of Jesus' death and resurrection
Films set in the Roman Empire
Films shot in Israel

External links